Johnstone Ridge is a mainly ice-free ridge in the Britannia Range, Antarctica, extending for  northward from Mount Olympus toward the south side of Hatherton Glacier. It was named by the Advisory Committee on Antarctic Names for Graeme N. Johnstone, a member of the Byrd Substation auroral party, winter 1962, and the McMurdo Station winter party, 1964.

References

Ridges of the Ross Dependency
Shackleton Coast